Gold River may refer to:


Canada
 Gold River, British Columbia
 Gold River Water Aerodrome, an airport
 Gold River, Nova Scotia, a community in the Chester Municipal District
 Gold River 21, a Mi'kmaq reserve, Lunenburg County, Nova Scotia

Other places
 Ashi River, formerly known as the Anchuhu or Gold River, China
 Do Ouro River (disambiguation)
 Gold River, California, United States
 Gold River Gambling Hall & Resort, now named Laughlin River Lodge, Laughlin, Nevada, United States

Other uses
 Gold River (horse), French Thoroughbred racehorse

See also
 Golden River (disambiguation)